Albert James Mitchell (born 22 January 1922 – April 1997) was an English footballer who played in the Football League for Blackburn Rovers, Luton Town, Middlesbrough, Northampton Town, Southport and Stoke City.

Career
Mitchell began his career with local side Burslem Albion, before joining Stoke City where he played four times in 1946–47 scoring twice against Middlesbrough and then featured six times in 1947–48. After two years at the Victoria Ground Mitchell had a short spell with Blackburn Rovers before joining Kettering Town. Northampton Town was his next club, as he signed for them in 1949. After 81 league appearances, Mitchell signed for Luton Town, where he spent three seasons before transferring to Middlesbrough early on in the 1954–55 season. After two years at Ayresome Park, he moved on to Southport, Wellington Town, Kidderminster Harriers, and Stafford Rangers.

Career statistics
Source:

References

1922 births
1997 deaths
Footballers from Stoke-on-Trent
English footballers
English Football League players
Stoke City F.C. players
Blackburn Rovers F.C. players
Kettering Town F.C. players
Northampton Town F.C. players
Luton Town F.C. players
Middlesbrough F.C. players
Southport F.C. players
Telford United F.C. players
Kidderminster Harriers F.C. players
Stafford Rangers F.C. players
Association football wingers